Derrick Carter (born October 21, 1969) is an American DJ, record producer and musician from Chicago, Illinois, United States. He is regarded as one of the best underground house key players currently active and is popular in Europe.

Biography
Carter was born in Compton, California, and raised in the western suburbs of Chicago. After practicing his DJ skills for a number of years as a teenager in his bedroom, he then made the step into the Chicago house scene.

In 1988, he released an EP with Mark Farina and Chris Nazuka as the group Symbols & Instruments. While the record was not a commercial success, it did have a strong influence on the burgeoning ambient techno movement in England. This established Carter as an international figure in the underground house scene.

Later years
Carter rarely gives extensive interviews and has kept a low profile since his rise to fame. He ran a record label named Classic Recordings that (as planned ten years before) ceased to exist after its hundredth release. The 12 inches start at CMC100 and run backwards, the LPs & CDs start at CMC100 and run forwards. Carter's DJ sets are firmly rooted in black music of the 1970s, frequently giving nods to old school disco, soul and jazz.

As a remixer, he has worked for a diverse range of artists including The Beloved, The Human League, Ricky Martin, Boris Dlugosch, Modjo, DJ Sneak and Röyksopp. After a brief hiatus, he returned to production, remixing artists such as Rosie Brown and Truman Industries.

In 2006, Carter was named No. 53 in the 100 Most Famous Chicagoans according to a survey (relying mostly on Google hits) by the free weekly newspaper, Newcity. Other house music artists making the cut included Felix da Housecat (No. 21) and Frankie Knuckles (No. 41).

Discography

Albums
 1996 The Future Sound of Chicago, Vol. 2
 1996 The Many Shades of Cajual
 1997 Derrick Carter - The Cosmic Disco
 1998 Pagan Offering
 2001 Derrick L. Carter presents: About Now...
 2002 Squaredancing in a Roundhouse
 2003 Azuli presents Derrick Carter - Choice - A Collection of Classics
 2003 Derrick L. Carter - Nearest Hits & Greatest Misses
 2004 Derrick Carter & Mark Farina - Live at OM
 2005 Sessions - Mixed by Derrick Carter
 2010 Fabric 56: Derrick Carter
2012 Derrick Carter - House Masters

References

External links 
 Official website
 
 Early 1990s Derrick Carter Mixtapes

American electronic musicians
American house musicians
DJs from Chicago
LGBT DJs
Living people
1969 births
House musicians
Deep house musicians
21st-century American LGBT people
Electronic dance music DJs